Kim Duk-joong (born 29 April 1940) is a South Korean former footballer who competed in the 1964 Summer Olympics.

References

External links
 
 

1940 births
Living people
South Korean footballers
Olympic footballers of South Korea
Footballers at the 1964 Summer Olympics
Asian Games medalists in football
Footballers at the 1962 Asian Games
Yonsei University alumni
Footballers from Seoul
Asian Games silver medalists for South Korea
Association football forwards
Medalists at the 1962 Asian Games